The Canadian Cadet Organizations, marketed under the name of Cadets Canada, are a youth program known as the Royal Canadian Sea Cadets, Royal Canadian Army Cadets, and Royal Canadian Air Cadets. The program is sponsored by the Canadian Armed Forces and funded through the Department of National Defence (DND), with additional support from the civilian Navy League, the Army Cadet League and the Air Cadet League, as well as local community sponsors that include service organizations and parent sponsoring groups supervised by the Leagues.

Overview
Cadet corps and squadrons exist in communities large and small from coast to coast to coast. Cadets are not members of the Canadian Armed Forces, nor is the program a prerequisite for military service. Adult leadership is provided primarily by the Cadet Organization Administration and Training Service, a sub-component of the Canadian Forces Reserve. Members of the Cadet Instructors Cadre Branch are assisted by Regular Force, Primary Reserve and retired members of all Branches, as well as Civilian Instructors and volunteers who have gone through a thorough screening process.

All elements of the CCO are under the command of the Commander, Cadets and Junior Canadian Rangers (CJCR). The Commander is directly responsible to the Vice Chief of the Defence Staff.

History

In 1862, five years before Confederation, "drill associations" were set up in Canada as a response to the Fenian Raids and the American Civil War. These early drill associations served to train militia and were open to people over the age of 13.

In 1879, the government authorized the creation of 74 "Association[s] for Drill in Educational Institutions", drill associations that were open to male youth over the age of 14 and which did not entail active service in the military.
The Riel Rebellion of 1885 motivated increased support to these youth drill associations. By 1887, they were called the cadet corps and were open to boys over the age of 12.

It was not until July 30, 1970 (the result of a change in legislation) that girls were officially permitted to join government-supported cadet corps and squadrons. Until then, girls paraded as "Wrennettes" supported by the Navy League and Air "Cadettes" supported by the Air Cadet League. On rare occasions, girls paraded unofficially with army cadets.

Musical groups

The three Cadet organizations maintain a number of volunteer bands, typically assisted by members of Canadian military bands in the Regular Force and Primary Reserve. The bands are primarily staffed by cadets from their respective organizations. The music program of Cadet Canada supports only three types of bands: military bands, bugle bands, and pipe bands. The drum major of these bands use a different command style from their counterparts in the CF, with different commands including counter-march and mark-time.

Corps and squadron that choose to create a cadet band must consult with their sponsoring committee which responsible for the maintenance of corps/squadron owned or loaned instruments

See also
Royal Canadian Sea Cadets
Royal Canadian Army Cadets
Royal Canadian Air Cadets
Junior Canadian Rangers
Canadian Forces
Other Sea Cadet organisations
History of the Cadet Instructors Cadre
JROTC

References

External links 

 Canadian Cadet Organizations
 National RCSC Unit Directory

Canadian Cadet organizations
1862 establishments in Canada